The NCAA Scoring Champion is the player who scored the most points in official NCAA games over the course of the season. Because the NCAA does not have a set standard number of games that each team must play, the scoring champion skews towards some teams rather than others (The Ivy League teams, for instance, do not start their seasons until almost a month after the official start of the NCAA season). Additionally, points scored in both conference and league tournament games are included, slanting the scoring titles towards players on teams that perform the best in the postseason.

Several Players have won the league scoring title multiple times but only Phil Latreille has led the NCAA in scoring three separate times. Impressively, Latreille did so by averaging more than 4 points per game in each of the three seasons.

Award winners
Source:

Winners by school

Winners by position

Multiple Winners

See also
College ice hockey statistics

References

External links

College ice hockey trophies and awards in the United States